The 2018 Women's T20 Challenge was the inaugural edition of Women's T20 Challenge, a women's Twenty20 cricket match which took place on 22 May 2018 at the Wankhede Stadium, Mumbai. In an effort to popularise women's cricket, the BCCI had organised the match ahead of Qualifier 1 of 2018 IPL. The exhibition match was also held by the BCCI as a rehearsal for a Women's IPL tournament, a target which would be accomplished in the future. IPL Supernovas won the match by 3 wickets in a last over thriller.

Squads

Scorecard

See also
 2018 Indian Premier League
 Women's Big Bash League

References

External links
 Series home at ESPN Cricinfo

Women's T20 Challenge
Women's Twenty20 cricket competitions
2017–18 Indian women's cricket